Arto Salminen (22 October 1959 – 15 November 2005) was a Finnish writer known for his social commentary.

Salminen, who was born in Helsinki, had also worked as a journalist and taxi driver; he wrote six novels which criticised with a morbid black sense of humour such current phenomena in Finnish society as neoliberalist politics, the decline of the welfare state, tabloid media, reality television and so on. His books gained a small cult following in Finland and they also received excellent reviews even though they did not sell particularly well.

Salminen received the Koskenkorva Prize in 1998, and the Olvi Prize in 2004. He died of a sudden stroke at Hausjärvi in November 2005.

Salminen's novel Varasto was posthumously adapted as a successful comedy film in 2011.

Bibliography
 Turvapaikka (1995) 
 Varasto (1998) 
 Paskateoria (2001) 
 Ei-kuori (2003) 
 Lahti (2004) 
 Kalavale (2005)

External links
Arto Salminen @ pHinnWeb

1959 births
2005 deaths
Finnish-language writers
Writers from Helsinki
20th-century Finnish novelists
20th-century Finnish journalists